Top Energy Limited is an electricity distribution and generation company based in Kerikeri, New Zealand. It owns and manages the electricity lines network in the Far North District of New Zealand, including Kaitaia, Kerikeri and Kaikohe. The service area covers 6,822 km2 and serves over 32,000 customers. It also owns and operates the Ngāwhā Geothermal Power Station.

Ownership
Far North power consumers connected to Top Energy’s line network own the company, with the shares being held on their behalf by the Top Energy Consumer Trust.

Distribution network
The Top Energy distribution network is connected to the national grid at Kaikohe substation.

The annual performance can be found in Top Energy's Group Annual Report on their website

Ngāwhā Geothermal Power Station
Top Energy owns and operates the Ngāwhā Geothermal Power Station on the Ngawha geothermal field. It utilises binary cycle technology manufactured by Ormat Industries and produces 56MW.

The power station opened in 1998 with a generating capacity of about 8 MW. It was the first power station to come into operation via a resource consent applied for and issued under the Resource Management Act 1991. In 2008, the plant was expanded, increasing the capacity to 25 MW and allowing the power station to provide 70% of Northland's electricity. 

In 2015, consents were granted for expansion with a further 50 MW of generation in two stages at a nearby site, with work beginning in late 2017. The first stage of the second expansion, generating an additional 32 MW was officially opened in July 2021. The stations now generate all the electricity the Far North needs for 97 per cent of the time, with surplus power sent to the national grid.

See also
 Electricity sector in New Zealand
 Geothermal power in New Zealand
 List of power stations in New Zealand

References

External links
 

Electric power distribution network operators in New Zealand
Geothermal power stations in New Zealand
Northland Region